Perlan (English: The Pearl) is a prominent landmark in the Icelandic capital of Reykjavík. It is situated on the top of Öskjuhlíð hill. It was originally only a cluster of hot water tanks, but in 1991 it was converted to a building open to the public, and now hosts an exhibition, a planetarium, an observation deck, a restaurant, and a cafe.

History 
In 1939, a single hot water tank was constructed on Öskjuhlíð hill in Reykjavík, where Perlan stands today. It is 61 meters above sea level, which gives enough pressure to push water up to the 10th floor of a building, 38 meters above sea level. That sufficed to supply water anywhere in Reykjavík – even to the hill where Hallgrímskirkja church stands today. In the next two decades, five more tanks rose beside the first one. They were torn down and rebuilt in the late eighties. 

In 1991, those six hot water tanks became the base of Perlan, a building open to the public. This project was largely at the behest of Davíð Oddsson, during his time as mayor of Reykjavík. Shaped and named after a pearl, it now characterizes Iceland's capital. Each tank can keep up to five million liters of hot water, with the volume of 5000 m3.

Perlan was originally designed by Ingimundur Sveinsson.

Exhibitions
 Wonders of Iceland is an exhibition that shows of Icelandic nature, glaciers, geysers, and volcanoes. There is also a timeline explaining how Iceland was formed and how life in Iceland evolved. Wonders of Iceland includes an replica of Látrabjarg cliff.
 An exhibition about the role of water in Icelandic nature.
 A planetarium that shows Icelandic nature and the solar system.
 A photographic exhibition showcasing the works of nature photographer Ragnar Th. Sigurðsson.

Observation deck
Being situated on the top of a hill, Perlan offers a view over Reykjavík, the surrounding areas, and the Reykjavík airport.

See also

 Sagas of Icelanders

References

External links

 

1991 establishments in Iceland
Buildings and structures completed in 1991
Buildings and structures in Reykjavík
Restaurants in Iceland
Tourist attractions in Reykjavík